Sancho V may refer to:

 Sancho V Sánchez of Gascony (d. c. 962)
 Sancho Ramírez (c. 1042 – 1094), Sancho V of Navarre